Ceruchus is a genus of stag beetles in the family Lucanidae. There are about 19 described species in Ceruchus.

Species
These 19 species belong to the genus Ceruchus:

 Ceruchus atavus Fairmaire, 1891
 Ceruchus chrysomelinus (Hochenwarth, 1785)
 Ceruchus chuduraziensis Okuda, 2007
 Ceruchus deuvei Boucher & Kral, 1997
 Ceruchus fuchsii Wickham, 1911
 Ceruchus ganyanae Huang & Chen, 2017
 Ceruchus katerinae Kral, 1995
 Ceruchus lignarius Lewis, 1883
 Ceruchus luojishanensis Okuda, 2008
 Ceruchus minor Tanikado & Okuda, 1994
 Ceruchus niger Boucher & Kral, 1997
 Ceruchus piceus (Weber, 1801)
 Ceruchus punctatus LeConte, 1869
 Ceruchus reginae Boucher & Kral, 1997
 Ceruchus sinensis Nagel, 1933
 Ceruchus striatus LeConte, 1859
 Ceruchus tabanai Okuda, 2008
 Ceruchus yangi Huang, Imura & Chen, 2011
 Ceruchus yingqii Huang & Chen, 2013

References

Further reading

External links

 

Syndesinae
Articles created by Qbugbot